The GER (Great Eastern Railway) Sports Stadium is a football and former greyhound racing, cricket and cycling stadium  in Robingoodfellows Lane, March, Cambridgeshire.

Origins
The stadium was constructed on the west side of Robingoodfellows Lane in north March around 1923 when the March GER United football team moved in.

Football
The GER Sports Ground is the Home of March Town United F.C.

Greyhound Racing
The ground started greyhound racing from 31 January 1931. The first winner was a greyhound called Theaker over a race distance of 600 yards (two laps of the 300 yard course) and then he contested a final later that day.

In the 1960s alterations were made to the ground to accommodate changes in the greyhound track which upset the football followers due to the fact that the wooden stand was moved further from the pitch.
 
Racing took place on Wednesday and Saturday evenings on a circumference of 450 yards. Race distances were 325, 550 and 760 yards, and it had an all grass circuit with an inside hare system. The racing finished in 1984.

References

Defunct greyhound racing venues in the United Kingdom
Football venues in England
March Town United F.C.
March, Cambridgeshire